Humphrey Gainsborough (1718 – 23 August 1776) was an English non-conformist minister, engineer, and inventor.

Humphrey Gainsborough was pastor to the Independent Church in Henley-on-Thames, England. He was the brother of the artist Thomas Gainsborough. He invented the drill plough (1766), winning a prize of £60 from the Royal Society for his efforts. He also invented the tide mill (1761), which allowed a mill wheel to rotate in either direction, winning a £50 prize from the Society for the Encouragement of Arts in London. In addition, he designed a self-ventilating fish wagon (1762).

Gainsborough designed Conway's Bridge, built in 1763 at Park Place close to Henley, an interesting rustic arched stone structure that still carries traffic on the road between Wargrave and Henley today. In 1768, he improved the slope on the road up the steep White Hill to the east of Henley, straightening it in the process.

James Watt perhaps included some of – and at least built on – Gainsborough's ideas on his steam engine. Watt had been working independently on improvements to the Newcomen "atmospheric engine" and subsequently patented these in 1769. Gainsborough is thus probably less well-known than he might have been.

The lock, weir and footbridge at Marsh Lock, just upstream from Henley on the River Thames, were designed by Gainsborough, together with other early locks from Sonning to Maidenhead (1772–73).

A blue plaque in Gainsborough's honour can be found in the town of Henley itself on the gates of the Manse, the house where he lived next to the Christ Church United Reformed Church. Inside he designed an early security chain and plate on one of the outside doors, allowing the door to be partially opened, that is still there now. Similar designs are used on many people's front doors today.

Epitaph
Philip Thicknesse wrote in The Gentleman's Magazine in 1785:

References

Bibliography
 
 

1718 births
1776 deaths
18th-century English clergy
18th-century British engineers
People from Henley-on-Thames
English inventors
English civil engineers
English mechanical engineers
British structural engineers
English Christian religious leaders
People associated with the Royal Society
Humphrey